The Basilica of St. Anne It is a religious building that functions as Catholic Minor Basilica and at the same time as co-cathedral of the Diocese of Willemstad (Latin: Dioecesis Gulielmopolitana) on the island of Curaçao in the Caribbean Sea off the coast of Venezuela. The other being the main cathedral dedicated to Our Lady the Queen of the Holy Rosary of the same city.

It was built between 1734 and 1752 in the sector of Otrabanda and received its present status in 1975 by decision of Pope Paul VI. Previously between 1843 and 1958 he held the title of pro-cathedral also granted by the Holy See. Follow the Roman or Latin rite and is one of the world's smallest churches basilicas.

It is a world heritage site by Unesco since 1997 when it was registered as part of the Historic Area of the city and port of Willemstad.

See also
Catholic Church in the Dutch Caribbean
Roman Catholic Diocese of Willemstad

References

Roman Catholic churches in Curaçao
Buildings and structures in Willemstad
Roman Catholic churches completed in 1752
18th-century Roman Catholic church buildings in Venezuela
18th-century religious buildings and structures in the Netherlands